Niels Frederik Ravn (18 June 1826 – 12 June 1910) was a Danish vice admiral and politician who held various cabinet posts including minister of war, minister of navy and minister of foreign affairs.

Biography
Ravn was born in Copenhagen on 18 June 1826. His parents were linen merchant Stephen Ravn and Marie F. Bünge. He became a cadet in 1838, a second lieutenant in 1845, and a first lieutenant in 1851. He participated in the first and second Schleswig wars. Following the wars he taught mathematics at the Naval Cadet Academy. He was promoted as rear admiral in 1885 and retired from the navy with the rank of vice admiral in 1891.

Ravn was a member of the conservative Højre party and served at the Parliament between 1873 and 1901. On 21 May 1873 he was named as the minister of navy in the cabinet of Ludvig Holstein-Holsteinsborg. He was appointed minister of navy to the cabinet led by Christen Andreas Fonnesbech on 14 July 1874. He was also named as the minister of war to the same cabinet on 28 August 1874. He held both posts until 11 November 1875. From 25 May 1897 to 27 April 1900 he served as the minister of foreign affairs in the cabinet of Hugo Egmont Hørring.

Ravn died in Holmen, Copenhagen, on 12 June 1910 and buried there.

References

External links

1826 births
1910 deaths
Foreign ministers of Denmark
Government ministers of Denmark
Politicians from Copenhagen
Danish military personnel of the Second Schleswig War
Military personnel from Copenhagen
People of the First Schleswig War
Members of the Folketing 1873–1876
Members of the Folketing 1876–1879
Members of the Folketing 1879–1881 (May)
Members of the Folketing 1881 (Jul)–1884
Members of the Folketing 1884–1887
Members of the Folketing 1887–1890
Members of the Folketing 1890–1892
Members of the Folketing 1892–1895
Members of the Folketing 1895–1898
Members of the Folketing 1898–1901